Rodgeriqus Smith (born September 8, 1985 in Snellville, Georgia) is an American Football wide receiver for the Hamilton Tiger-Cats. He was signed on October 27, 2009.

College career
Smith attended Auburn University and walked-on the Tigers football team. Smith caught his first collegiate pass for 38 yards against Mississippi State during his freshman season. In Smith's sophomore season, he caught his first touchdown from 20 yards out against the same Mississippi State Bulldogs. Originally a walk-on, Smith was awarded a scholarship after the 2006 season. Smith finished 7th on Auburn's all-time receiving yards list with 1,598.

References

1985 births
Living people
People from Snellville, Georgia
Sportspeople from the Atlanta metropolitan area
Players of American football from Georgia (U.S. state)
Auburn Tigers football players
San Diego Chargers players